Scholars is the third studio album by American duo Buke and Gase. It was released on January 18, 2019, through Brassland Records.

Track listing

References

2019 albums
Brassland Records albums